Dušan Jevtić (born 29 March 1992 in Gradačac) is a Bosnian-Herzegovinian footballer. He is currently playing for TSV Schwabmünchen in the German 5th level Bayernliga.

Club career
He joined FK Sarajevo in August 2013, and was released later that 2013–14 season. Dušan previous played for Duisburg since the winter of 2012, after he spent his youth and first years as a senior playing for TSV 1860 München. He spent the majority of his career in the German 4th and 5th tiers.

References

External links

1992 births
Living people
People from Gradačac
Association football midfielders
Bosnia and Herzegovina footballers
Bosnia and Herzegovina youth international footballers
Bosnia and Herzegovina under-21 international footballers
TSV 1860 Munich II players
MSV Duisburg players
FK Sarajevo players
IK Oddevold players
NK Čelik Zenica players
TSV Buchbach players
VfR Garching players
Regionalliga players
2. Bundesliga players
Ettan Fotboll players
Premier League of Bosnia and Herzegovina players
Oberliga (football) players
Bosnia and Herzegovina expatriate footballers
Expatriate footballers in Germany
Bosnia and Herzegovina expatriate sportspeople in Germany
Expatriate footballers in Sweden
Bosnia and Herzegovina expatriate sportspeople in Sweden